Davidson's is a Roanoke, Virginia-based chain of menswear stores.  The company was founded in 1910.  Its downtown location is at 412 S. Jefferson St., in a former S&W Cafeteria, that it has occupied since 1964.  In 2008, the location underwent a $2 million renovation.  Other locations are at the Grand Pavilion in Roanoke County across from the Tanglewood Mall, and Westlake Plaza, at Smith Mountain Lake, Hardy, Virginia.

References

External links
Davidson's website (accessed Oct 6, 2008)

Clothing retailers of the United States
Companies based in Virginia